is a railway station in the city of  Murakami, Niigata, Japan, operated by East Japan Railway Company (JR East).

Lines
Sakamachi Station is served by the Uetsu Main Line, and is 48.0 kilometers from the starting point of the line at Niitsu Station. It is also a terminus for the 90.7 kilometer Yonesaka Line.

Station layout
The station consists of two  island platforms connected by a footbridge. The station has a Midori no Madoguchi staffed ticket office.

Platforms

History
Sakamachi Station opened on 1 November 1914. A new station building was completed in 1963.  With the privatization of Japanese National Railways (JNR) on 1 April 1987, the station came under the control of JR East.

Passenger statistics
In fiscal 2017, the station was used by an average of 717 passengers daily (boarding passengers only).

Surrounding area
 Sakamachi Post Office
Niigata Prefectural Sakamachi Hospital

See also
 List of railway stations in Japan

References

External links

 JR East station information 

Stations of East Japan Railway Company
Railway stations in Niigata Prefecture
Uetsu Main Line
Yonesaka Line
Railway stations in Japan opened in 1914
Murakami, Niigata